Brooklyn is the most populous borough of New York City, New York. Many artists have originated from Brooklyn or have relocated there.

Brooklyn-based fine artists

Painters 

Ruth Abrams (1912 – 12 March 1986) – New York School painter who was born in Brooklyn. As a painter, she belonged to the New York School. After her death, a critic from The New York Times remarked that she was "a woman unfairly neglected in a macho era." Her papers are held at the Yeshiva University Museum and the Smithsonian Archives of American Art.
Alexander Brook (July 14, 1898 – February 26, 1980) – American artist and critic who was born in Brooklyn. During his twenties, Brooks painted still lifes and posed figures with vigor and sensuality. He later began to emulate the style of Jules Pascin. From 1924 to 1927 he was the assistant director of Whitney Studio Club. His realist painting was exhibited widely and he won multiple awards. Georgia Jungle won the Carnegie Prize at the Carnegie International art exhibition. Unfortunately for Brook, the realist style fell out of favor late in the 1940s.
Marion Greenwood (April 6, 1909 – August 20, 1970) – painter and engraver who had lived in Brooklyn.
Breuk Iversen (born July 25, 1964) – lived in Williamsburg, Brooklyn and is the founding member of the art collaborative known as "Offalists", using common refuse as a medium.
Nell Choate Jones (1879–1981) – artist who had lived in Brooklyn Jones was awarded an honorary doctorate by the State University of New York in 1972 and received the Distinguished Citizen Award from the Brooklyn Museum of Art in 1979. She exhibited regularly across North America in the 1940s and 1950s as well as overseas in France, Holland, Belgium, Switzerland, Greece, and Japan. Her work can be found in many museums, including the High Museum of Art in Atlanta, Georgia and the Morris Museum of Art in Augusta, Georgia.
Tim Okamura (born 1968) – painter based in Brooklyn Okamura is known for his depiction of African-American and minority subjects in urban settings, and his combination of graffiti and realism. His work has been featured in several major motion pictures and in London's National Portrait Gallery. He was also one of several artists to be shortlisted in 2006 for a proposed portrait of Queen Elizabeth of England.
Michael Anthony Pegues (born May 11, 1962) – artist and designer, born and raised in Brooklyn. Self-taught, modern-day Fauve, Expressionist as well as Pop artist, contemporary of Andy Warhol, Jean-Michel Basquiat, Keith Haring, his work is strongly influenced by Hip Hop and Graffiti.
David Salle (born September 28, 1952) – painter and leading contemporary figurative artist, Salle helped define postmodern sensibility. His paintings and prints comprise what appear to be randomly juxtaposed images, or images placed on top of one other with deliberately ham-fisted techniques.
Walter Satterlee (January 18, 1844 – May 28, 1908) – American figure and genre painter who was born in Brooklyn. He was a member of the American Water Color Society and of the New York Etching Club, and was an excellent teacher. Satterlee died in Brooklyn in 1908.
Susan Sills – drawings and portraits.
Danny Simmons (born August 17, 1953) – abstract-expressionist painter who was a Brooklyn resident in 2009 Simmons is the co-founder and Chairman of Rush Philanthropic Arts Foundation (since 1995), which provides disadvantaged urban youth with arts access and education. Simmons also founded Rush Arts Gallery and soon thereafter converted part of his loft in Brooklyn into the Corridor Gallery. Both galleries provide exhibition opportunities to early and mid-career artists who do not have commercial representation through galleries or private dealers.
Andrea Zittel (born September 6, 1965) – installation artist who has lived in Brooklyn Zittel produced her first "Living Unit"—an experimental structure intended to reduce everything necessary for living into a simple, compact system—as a means of facilitating basic activities within her  Brooklyn storefront apartment.

Photographers and video artists 

 Stephen Shames (born 1968) – photographer who was living in Brooklyn in 2008
 Ka-Man Tse – photographer, video artist, and educator based in Brooklyn.

See also
 List of people from Brooklyn
 Lists of artists by nationality

References

Further reading
  
  
  
 

Brooklyn artists

Brooklyn
Brooklyn-related lists